The acid peptic diseases, also known as acid peptic disorders are a collection of diseases involving acid production in the stomach and nearby parts of the gastrointestinal tract.  It includes gastroesophageal reflux disease, gastritis, gastric ulcer, duodenal ulcer, esophageal ulcer, Zollinger–Ellison syndrome and Meckel's diverticulum ulcer. Acid peptic disorders are the result of distinctive, but overlapping pathogenic mechanisms leading to either excessive acid secretion or diminished mucosal defense.

References

Stomach disorders